Contemporary circus (also known as new circus, and nouveau cirque and cirque contemporain in French-speaking countries) is a genre of performing arts developed in the late 20th century in which a story or theme is conveyed through traditional circus skills.
This recognisable genre could arguably be more akin to Variety (in American vaudeville) as animals are rarely used in this type of performance, and traditional circus skills are blended with a more  choreographic or character-driven approach. Compared with the traditional circuses of the past, the contemporary approach tends to focus more attention on the overall aesthetic impact, sometimes on character and story development, and on the use of lighting design, original music, and costume design to convey thematic or narrative content.

History 

The contemporary circus (or new circus, or nouveau cirque) movement originated in Australia, the West Coast of the United States, France and the United Kingdom from the early 1970s to the mid-1980s. The impetus came from the "new wave" theatre movement and street theatre as well as from traditional circus.

Early pioneers of the new circus genre included: The Royal Lichtenstein Quarter-Ring Sidewalk Circus, founded in San Jose, CA in 1969 by Nick Weber, SJ; Circus Oz, forged in Australia in 1977 from SoapBox Circus (1976) and New Circus (1973); the Pickle Family Circus, founded in San Francisco in 1975; Ra-Ra Zoo in 1984 in London; Nofit State Circus in 1984 from Wales; Cirque du Soleil, founded in Quebec in 1984; Cirque Plume and Archaos from France in 1984 and 1986 respectively and; Rock n' Roll Circus in 1986.

More recent examples include: Cirque Éloize (founded in Quebec in 1993); New York's Bindlestiff Family Cirkus (1995); Sweden's Cirkus Cirkör (1995); Arizona's Flam Chen (1996); Teatro ZinZanni (founded in Seattle in 1998); the West African Circus Baobab (late 1990s); Montreal's Les 7 doigts de la main (founded in 2002); San Francisco's Vau De Vire Society; Wanderlust Circus from Portland, Oregon; Australia's Circa (originally named Rock n' Roll Circus it changed to a director led model and renamed itself in 2004); Cirque Mechanics (2004); Asheville's Fox and Beggar Theater (2013); and American cirque noir companies Lucent Dossier Experience (2004), PURE Cirkus (2004),, the Red Light Variety Show of Boise, Idaho (2008), as well as Recirquel Company (founded in Budepest, 2012)

The genre includes other circus troupes such as the Vermont-based Circus Smirkus (founded in 1987 by Rob Mermin), Le Cirque Imaginaire (later renamed Le Cirque Invisible, both founded and directed by Victoria Chaplin, daughter of Charlie Chaplin), the Tiger Lillies, and Dislocate, while The Jim Rose Circus is an interesting take on the circus sideshow. In Northern England, Skewed Circus combines punk, rap, dance music, comedy, and stunts to deliver "pop-circus" entertainment to young urban audiences.

It could be argued that the blending of traditional circus arts with contemporary aesthetic sensibilities and theatrical techniques has revitalized the general public's interest in and appetite for the circus. Certainly the most conspicuous success story has been that of Cirque du Soleil, the Canadian circus company whose estimated annual revenue now exceeds US$810 million, and whose nouveau cirque shows have been seen by nearly 90 million spectators in over 200 cities on five continents.

Characteristics 

Contemporary circus sometimes combines traditional circus skills and theatrical techniques to convey a story or theme. Such acts may include acrobatics, juggling, aerial arts, acting, comedy, magic, music, and other elements. Contemporary circus productions may often be staged in theaters or in outdoor tents. Music is often composed exclusively for the production, and aesthetic influences are drawn as much from contemporary culture as from circus tradition. Animal acts appear less frequently in contemporary circus than in traditional circus. Theatrical scenes or clown gags may provide seamless segues between acts, making the traditional role of the ringmaster redundant.

Below is a table comparing several aspects of traditional and contemporary circus performances.

"Extreme circus" is a high-energy, street-inspired genre of contemporary circus whose aesthetic is more free-form and improvisational; its music may encompass hip hop, virtuosic percussion and beat-boxing.

See also 
 Circus school

References 

Circuses